Anna Maria Alberghetti (born May 15, 1936) is an Italian-American actress and soprano.

Biography
Born May 15, 1936, in Pesaro, Marche, in central Italy, she starred on Broadway and won a Tony Award in 1962 as Best Actress (Musical) for Carnival! (she tied with Diahann Carroll for the musical No Strings).

Alberghetti was a child prodigy. Her father was an opera singer and concert master of the Rome Opera Company. Her mother was a pianist. At age six, Anna Maria sang in a concert on the Isle of Rhodes with a 100-piece orchestra. She performed at Carnegie Hall in New York at the age of 13. At 15, she was introduced to American film audiences in Frank Capra's 1951 musical Here Comes the Groom, which starred Bing Crosby. At 16, she was Red Skelton's opening act during his Sahara Hotel engagement in Las Vegas.

Her younger sister, Carla, also became a musical artist, who appeared in many stage productions. She eventually became Anna Maria's replacement in her Tony Award-winning role on Broadway. She has a brother, Paul Alberghetti, who is an entertainment attorney and film producer. He is married to filmmaker Michele Noble.

Professional career
Alberghetti appeared twice on the cover of Life magazine. She appeared on The Ed Sullivan Show more than 50 times. She guest-starred in 1957 on NBC's The Gisele MacKenzie Show.  That same year, she performed in the premiere episode of The Pat Boone Chevy Showroom on ABC.

She co-starred with Dean Martin in 1957's Ten Thousand Bedrooms and with Jerry Lewis in  The Jazz Singer in 1959, and Cinderfella 1960, not long after the Martin and Lewis comedy team parted ways.

Alberghetti also appeared in 1955's The Last Command, which starred Sterling Hayden, and had the female lead in the Western Duel at Apache Wells in 1957.

In 1959, the 22-year-old Alberghetti played the lead in "The Conchita Vasquez Story" of NBC's Wagon Train. She was cast as part of a gang of Comancheros who intend to attack the wagon train to steal rifles headed to the United States Army. Instead, she decides to leave the Comancheros and move west after she falls in love with scout Flint McCullough, played by Robert Horton. Tragically, as the episode ends, Conchita is killed by a bullet from her own people when they ambush the wagon train.

On March 1, 1961, she appeared as a guest contestant on the television series I've Got A Secret. She guest-starred on The Andy Williams Show on March 28, 1963, and performed on The Hollywood Palace variety program's episode of May 2, 1964.

She appeared as a mystery guest on What's My Line on November 23, 1958. She appeared for a second mystery-guest appearance on April 30, 1961. In 1965, Alberghetti went on tour and performed on stage with Bob Hope in Okinawa for U.S. servicemen.

Alberghetti has toured in many theatrical productions and continues with her popular one-woman cabaret act. She had roles in a pair of 2001 films, The Whole Shebang and Friends & Family.

Alberghetti appeared in television commercials for Good Seasons salad dressing during the 1970s and early 1980s, where she was cast as "The Good Seasons Lady".

Personal life
Alberghetti became a U.S. citizen in 1961.

She was married to television producer-director Claudio Guzmán from 1964 to 1974. They had two children: Alexandra (b. 1966) and Pilar (b. 1970).

Partial filmography

Stage work

Rose-Marie (1960) 
Carnival! (1961) 
Fanny (1963; 1968)
The Fantasticks (1968) 
West Side Story (1964) 
The Most Happy Fella (1969) 
Cabaret (1970) 
Kismet (1971)
The Student Prince (1976) 
The Sound of Music (1978; 1985)
Side by Side by Sondheim (1980)
Camelot (1981)
The Fabulous Palm Springs Follies (2000)
Senior Class (2007)

References

Further reading
 Jackson, Ursula. "Anna Maria Alberghetti". In Italian Americans on the Twentieth Century, ed. George Carpetto and Diane M. Evanac. Tampa, FL: Loggia Press, 1999, pp. 6–7
 Dye, David. Child and Youth Actors: Filmography of Their Entire Careers, 1914-1985. Jefferson, NC: McFarland & Co., 1988, p. 4.

External links

 
 
 Anna Maria Alberghetti at MSN Movies

1936 births
Living people
People from Pesaro
Italian film actresses
Italian women singers
Italian emigrants to the United States
Tony Award winners
20th-century Italian actresses
Italian musical theatre actresses
21st-century Italian actresses
United Service Organizations entertainers